General elections were held in Mauritius on 15 September 1991. Three main parties gained seats in this election: the Militant Socialist Movement, Mauritian Militant Movement and the Labour Party. The MSM formed an alliance with the MMM and the Labour party formed an alliance with the Mauritian Social Democrat Party (PMSD). On 17 September 1991, results showed that MSM-MMM won 57 seats out of 66 seats. This gave 95% of seats to MSM-MMM leader Anerood Jugnauth and 5% to Labour Party-PMSD leader Navin Ramgoolam.

Campaign
The main political parties taking part in the elections were the Militant Socialist Movement and Labour Party which were the current government, and the Mauritian Militant Movement which was the current opposition party. Earlier that year, Navin Ramgoolam became the leader of the Labour Party. As a result, the MSM-Labour Party coalition broke down in February 1991 because Ramgoolam demanded that the deal between the parties should be reviewed and that the MSM leader, Anerood Jugnauth, should hold the office of Prime Minister for half of the term (two and a half years), with Ramgoolam serving out the remainder of the term. However, Jugnauth did not want to step aside in favour of Ramgoolam. Ramgoolam then announced that his party would contest the elections due September on its own.

Jugnauth proposed an electoral pact with the Mauritian Militant Movement(MMM), the party which Jugnauth himself had formerly led between 1976 and 1983, before the formation of the MSM. The two parties agreed that Anerood Jugnauth would remain Prime Minister for the full term of 5 years and that MMM leader Paul Bérenger would serve in his Cabinet. Bérenger later became Minister of External Affairs.

During the term, Rama Sithanen, Sheila Bappoo and Daram Gockool defected from the MSM to the Mauritian Labour Party. The defections put the MSM under increasing strain, and Jugnauth came under pressure to hold general elections in 1995 rather than 1996, as constitutionally scheduled.

Results

By constituency

References

Mauritius
1991 in Mauritius
Elections in Mauritius
Election and referendum articles with incomplete results